David Farrier (born 25 December 1982) is a New Zealand journalist and actor. He has worked in news and documentary, including features on New Zealand television and co-directing the internationally distributed documentary film Tickled (2016). In 2018, he created the Netflix documentary series Dark Tourist, in which he visits obscure, peculiar, or dangerous tourist spots. He has also done some acting, most notably in the Rhys Darby mockumentary series Short Poppies.

Career
Farrier started his journalism career at 3 News, and he was Nightline's entertainment reporter from 2006 until the program's end in 2013. In 2011, he made a 45-minute documentary for TV3 about the origins of "God Defend New Zealand", one of the two New Zealand national anthems. In 2014, he played a fictionalised version of himself in Darby's 2014 mockumentary series Short Poppies. 

In 2015, he became co-host, with reporter Sam Hayes,of the TV3 show Newsworthy, which aired for one year. In a June 2015 episode of Newsworthy, Farrier interviewed the then-leader of the New Conservative Party, Colin Craig, in a sauna. Craig resigned as party leader the same month that the conversation aired, with some in the media saying the interview was one of the contributing factors to his leadership failing. This interview was also played during the 2017 defamation trial between Craig and Whale Oil Beef Hooked blogger Cameron Slater. In 2022, Farrier expressed regret for the interview because of Craig's political views, saying that it drew parallels to "what Jimmy Fallon did to Donald Trump. Fallon, ruffling Trump's hair. Me, topless, joking around with Colin. It was an image that instantly excused all that bad shit."

In November 2016, Farrier wrote an article for The Spinoff about individuals with various sexual fetishes issuing "challenges" or dares to children on YouTube, encouraging them to make seemingly innocent videos of themselves; this led to several YouTube accounts being banned. Farrier is a frequent guest contributor to The Spinoff, covering topics such as conspiracy theories, COVID-19, media, and culture.

In 2018, he was an executive producer and served as presenter on the Netflix documentary series Dark Tourist, in which he travels to various locations around the world associated with death and tragedy.

Podcasts
From 2013 to 2017, he co-hosted the cryptozoology-focused audio program The Cryptid Factor with comedian Rhys Darby and producer Leon 'Buttons' Kirkbeck. 

In September 2020, Farrier appeared on the podcast Armchair Expert with Dax Shepard and thereafter has worked alongside the Armchair umbrella in releasing a podcast series dubbed Armchaired and Dangerous, which discusses popular conspiracy theories.

In May 2022, Farrier launched Flightless Bird, a new podcast for Armchair based upon his observations of American culture after being unable to return to New Zealand during the COVID-19 pandemic.

In 2022, he presented an eight-part podcast for Audible titled When a Good Man Kills, which covers the story of how the boxer Tim "Doc" Anderson murdered his manager, Rick "Elvis" Parker.

Tickled
In 2014, Farrier began production of the feature-length documentary Tickled, in collaboration with Dylan Reeve. The film centres on "competitive endurance tickling" and videos featuring it, as well as those producing the videos. The film explores the legal and ethical issues of making the videos and has itself been the subject of legal challenges.

The film premiered in January 2016 at the Sundance Film Festival and was shown on HBO. In 2017, Farrier did a short follow-up documentary, with previously unseen footage, entitled The Tickle King.

Webworm
Farrier publishes the newsletter Webworm, which he started in 2020. The newsletter covers a range of topics and in its early years had a specific focus on conspiracy theories, such as QAnon. It has since broadened its topics of coverage: for example, in 2022, Farrier broke a story about allegations of employment and sexual abuse at Arise Church. He has also covered stories on the toymaker Zuru's defamation lawsuit of former employees.

Mister Organ

In 2016, Farrier investigated the controversial car clamping policies of Michael Organ, who owned the Bashford Antiques shop in Auckland's Ponsonby suburb and whose practices had created friction with local residents. Farrier's story was published by the online news outlet The Spinoff. Due to this coverage, the New Zealand Parliament introduced legislation outlawing excessive clamping fees. Farrier subsequently produced a documentary about Organ and the conflict with neighbours, called Mister Organ, which was released on 10 November 2022.

Organ eventually sold Bashford Antiques and relocated to Whanganui. Once the store was closed, Farrier took the broken and abandoned sign. Organ subsequently took Farrier to the Whanganui Disputes Tribunal in order to reclaim it. Since the sign had gone missing, Farrier was forced to pay NZ$3,000 in restitution to Organ.

In late October 2022, broadcaster and Platform founder, Sean Plunket, shared screenshots on Twitter of a temporary protection order issued against Farrier ahead of Mister Organ scheduled released in November 2022. On 5 November, Farrier confirmed during a media interview with Radio New Zealand host Kim Hill that the protection order was genuine. On 8 November, Farrier announced during an interview with Tova O'Brien on Today FM that he would be pursuing legal action against Plunket for disseminating the protection order and denied committing violence against Organ's family.

Personal life
Farrier was raised in Bethlehem, Tauranga, where he was home-schooled before attending the Christian Bethlehem College. He has written about Bethlehem College's policies on sexuality and gender, which many have labelled as homophobic and transphobic, in his blog Webworm.

Farrier was raised by devout Baptists and describes his younger self as "a really good Christian". He initially enrolled to study medicine but soon lost interest in the discipline and instead entered the Auckland University of Technology, where he graduated with a Bachelor of Communication Studies degree in 2005.

In 2012, during the government sitting of New Zealand's Marriage Equality Bill, Farrier came out as bisexual, identifying his relationship with Grayson Coutts, the son of yachtsman Russell Coutts; the couple have since separated.

Filmography

References

External links

 
 David Farrier at 3 News (archived)
 Tickled official website
 

1982 births
Bisexual men
Living people
New Zealand male television actors
New Zealand journalists
New Zealand LGBT journalists
21st-century LGBT people
People from Tauranga